The Party for Historic Hungary (TMP) was a national conservative political party in Hungary, existed officially between 1990 and 2003.

The TMP was founded by pensioner Ernő Diószegi. It contested the 1994 parliamentary election with only one candidate, János Varga in Kőszeg, who gained 203 votes. The TMP did not contest any further elections, the party became technically defunct. Diószegi died on 12 July 2001. The party was officially dissolved by the Metropolitan Court of Budapest on 30 May 2003.

Election results

National Assembly

References

Sources

Defunct political parties in Hungary
Political parties established in 1990
Political parties disestablished in 2003
1990 establishments in Hungary
2003 disestablishments in Hungary